Aristolochia esperanzae is a species of Aristolochia found in Argentina, Bolivia, and Paraguay

References

External links

esperanzae
Flora of Bolivia
Flora of Argentina